Hoppen is a surname. Notable people with the surname include:

Dave Hoppen (born 1964), American basketball player
Kelly Hoppen (born 1959), British interior designer, writer, and entrepreneur
Larry Hoppen (1951–2012), American musician

See also
Hopper (surname)
Joppen